Edward Herbert (1727 – 2 March 1770) was an Irish politician.

He represented Inistioge as a Member of Parliament in the Irish House of Commons between 1749 and 1760. Herbert then sat for Tralee from 1761 until his death 1770.

References

1727 births
1770 deaths
Irish MPs 1727–1760
Irish MPs 1761–1768
Irish MPs 1769–1776
Members of the Parliament of Ireland (pre-1801) for County Kerry constituencies
Members of the Parliament of Ireland (pre-1801) for County Kilkenny constituencies